N. Lee Wood (born November 15, 1955) is an American author.  She has written science fiction, fantasy, crime and mainstream novels.

Biography
N. Lee Wood was born November 15, 1955 in Hartford, Connecticut. She became a naturalized citizen of New Zealand in November, 2020.

She holds a Master's degree in English literature from the Open University of Great Britain. 

She is an alumnus of the Clarion West Writers Workshop. Wood  has travelled widely, and lived in the UK, France, Australia, and New Zealand. 

She was married to author Norman Spinrad from 1990 to 2005.

Awards and honors
Her novel Looking for the Mahdi was nominated for the 1997 Arthur C. Clarke Award.

Selected works

Novels
Faraday's Orphans (1995)
Looking for the Mahdi (1996)
Bloodrights (1999)
Master of None (2002)
Redemption (as Lee Jackson, 2007)

Inspector Keen Dunliffe Series
Kingdom of Lies (2005)
Kingdom of Silence (2009)

Short fiction 
 "Molly Haskowin" (1990)
 "Memories that Dance Like Dust in the Summer Heat" (1990)
 "In the Land of No" (1991)
 "Three Merry Pranksters at the Louvre" (2000)
 "Thicker than Water" (2001)
 "Balzac" (2003)
 "Scapegoats" (2014)

Anthologies
 Nemira '94 with Romulus Bărbulescu, George Anania and Norman Spinrad (1994)

Essays
 "Report from Clarion West" (1985)
 "Magnum Opus Con (III)" (1988)
 "1988 World Sf Meeting in Budapest" (1989)
 "ABA, Parisienne Style" (1989)
 "SF in France" (Locus #357) (1990)
 "World SF Meeting at Den Haag" (1990)
 "Parcon '90 Report" (1991)
 "SF in France" (Locus #372) (1992)
 "1992 Salon du Livre" (1992)
 "Freucon/1992 World SF Meeting" (1992)
 "Étonnants Voyaguers Festival" (1993)
 "1993 Salon du Livre" (1993)

References

External links

1955 births
Living people
20th-century American novelists
21st-century American novelists
American science fiction writers
American women short story writers
American women novelists
Writers from Hartford, Connecticut
Women science fiction and fantasy writers
20th-century American women writers
21st-century American women writers
Novelists from Connecticut
The Magazine of Fantasy & Science Fiction people
20th-century American short story writers
21st-century American short story writers